Rocky River High School is a high school in Mint Hill, North Carolina; a suburb of Charlotte. Inaugural classes began in the fall of 2010. Its original principal was Mark Nixon, the former principal of East Mecklenburg High School, who was replaced in 2012 by Brandy Nelson. In 2016, Ericia Turner became the new principal.

Notable alumni
Jaire Alexander, NFL All-pro cornerback for the Green Bay Packers
DeAndre' Bembry, NBA player for the Toronto Raptors
Jaden Springer, American basketball player

References

Schools in Mecklenburg County, North Carolina
Public high schools in North Carolina
Educational institutions established in 2010
2010 establishments in North Carolina